Homalopteroides wassinkii is a species of ray-finned fish in the genus Homalopteroides.  It can be found in Sumatra, Borneo, and Java.

References

Balitoridae
Fish described in 1853